The Estádio Municipal José dos Santos Pinto is an association football stadium located in Covilhã, Portugal, which is used by S.C. Covilhã as their home ground.

Notable matches 
On 21 March 2020, the stadium hosted the first ever Taça da Liga Feminina final between Benfica and Sporting CP.

References

External links
 Stadium presentation at Municipality of Covilhã website
 Stadium page at TheFinalBall.com

S.C. Covilhã
Football venues in Portugal
Buildings and structures in Castelo Branco District
Buildings and structures in Covilhã
Sports venues completed in 1935